Luščani  is a village in central Croatia, in the Town of Petrinja, Sisak-Moslavina County.

Demographics
According to the 2011 census, the village of Luščani had 163 inhabitants. This represents 24.33% of its pre-war population according to the 1991 census.

Notable people 

 Đuro Bakrač  (1915-1996) - partisan general and People's Hero of Yugoslavia

References

Populated places in Sisak-Moslavina County
Serb communities in Croatia